Waghapur is a census town in Yavatmal district in the Indian state of Maharashtra.

Demographics
 India census, Waghapur had a population of 8405. Males constitute 54% of the population and females 46%. Waghapur has an average literacy rate of 69%, higher than the national average of 59.5%: male literacy is 63%, and female literacy is 76%. In Waghapur, 10% of the population is under 6 years of age.

References

Cities and towns in Yavatmal district